The 5th Kollam Municipal Corporation council election was held on 8 December 2020 and the result announced on 16 December. LDF won 39 seats, UDF fronts won 9 seats, NDA won 6 seats and others won 1 seat. CPI(M) lead LDF won the majority to rule

History
Kollam became the fourth municipal corporation of Kerala in the year 2000. Since the inception, only LDF ruled the corporation.

Election history
Since the incorporation of the KMC in 2000, only the LDF has been in power.

Background
The tenure of the members of the municipal corporation of Kollam ended on early November 2020. As per the voters list published in 2020 November, there were around 2,88,804 eligible voters (1,38,820 male voters, 1,49,984 female voters) in which 2,04,058 cast their votes through 265 polling stations in the corporation area. The total polling rate was 66.06%.

There were 55 wards with one polling booth in each ward. The vote counting station in the municipality was Government Boys HSS, Thevally.

Parties and coalitions
There are two major political coalitions in Kollam corporation. The Left Democratic Front (LDF) is the coalition of left wing and far-left parties, led by the Communist Party of India (Marxist) (CPI(M)). The United Democratic Front (UDF) is the coalition of centrist and centre-left parties led by the Indian National Congress. The third front is led by Bharatiya Janata Party.

Left Democratic Front

United Democratic Front

National Democratic Alliance

Vote share by alliances

Results

By alliance

See also
Kollam Municipal Corporation
2005 Kollam Municipal Corporation election
2020 Paravur Municipal election

References

2020 Kerala local body elections
Government of Kollam
Kollam